The National Order of Merit is an order of merit of Mauritania.

References

External links

Orders, decorations, and medals of Mauritania
Orders of merit